Rateb Al-Awadat (13 October 1970 – 26 March 2021) was a Jordanian footballer, who was a left-back who started his career with Hittin (Marka) Refugee camp team then joined Al-Faisaly until he retired and became a coach.

Career
Rateb Al-Awadat played his entire career for Al-Faisaly from 1987 to 2006. He was part of the Jordanian national team from 1998 to 2008, where he earned 46 caps scoring one goal.

The mark of Rateb's retirement in playing football took place in an international friendly match between his national team Jordan against Lebanon in Amman on 28 January 2008, when Jordan won 4–1. Rateb played the first 5 minutes of the match. As the match referee blew his whistle after the first 5 minutes to stop the match for Rateb to leave the field, Rateb gave the captain armband to his old international teammate Hatem Aqel as well as his #4 jersey to his old teammate of Al-Faisaly Qusai Abu Alieh.

He later became a manager at Al-Faisaly.

International goals
Score and result list Jordan's goal tally first, score column indicates score after Al-Awadat goal.

Personal life
In January 2021, Al-Awadat was treated for cancer at the Hadassah Medical Center, Israel. as his Brother Khalid Al-Awadat Said in a Facebook live "that his brother didn’t know he is going to "Israel" as the transfer done by the Jordanian authorities and his family thought he is going to Germany. and he is refusing the treatment and want to go back to Jordan, because he is refusing to deal with the Israeli occupation."

Al-Awadat died on 26 March 2021, aged 50.

References

Sources
Defeat Lebanon in a Friendly Marking the Retirement of Rateb Al-Awadat
Al-Awadat Head Coach of Al-Faisaly (Amman) After the Departure of Al-Yamani 
Replaced By Tha'er Jassam as Head Coach of Al-Faisaly (Amman) 
Al-Awadat Returns to Coaching Al-Faisaly (Amman) After the Resignation of Math'har Al-Saeed  
Sacked Once Again and Replaced By Romanian Tita
Rateb Al-Awadat Signs Up to Coach Al-Fayha' FC (KSA) 
Al-Awadat Up to the Task of Coaching Al-Sheikh Hussein FC

External links 

Jordanian footballers
Jordan international footballers
Association football defenders
Sportspeople from Amman
Al-Faisaly SC players
Jordanian Pro League players
Al-Faisaly SC managers
Al-Fayha FC managers
Saudi Professional League managers
Jordanian expatriate football managers
Jordanian football managers
Expatriate football managers in Saudi Arabia
1970 births
2021 deaths
Deaths from cancer in Jordan
2004 AFC Asian Cup players